Whitehall is a hamlet in the civil parish of Odiham in Hampshire, England. Its nearest town is Hook, approximately 3.5 miles (4.75 km) away.

Hamlets in Hampshire
Odiham